Palazzo Comunale may refer to:

 Palazzo Comunale, San Gimignano, seat of the civic authority in San Gimignano, Italy
 , site of an astronomical clock in Italy
 Palazzo d'Accursio or Palazzo Comunale, former site of administrative offices of the city of Bologna, Italy